The Marin School (TMS) is a private high school located in San Rafael, California. The school is named after Marin County in which it is located.

History
The Marin School, formerly known as North Bay Secondary School then as North Bay Marin School, was founded in 1980 and originally included both a middle school and high school.  The school accepted a wide range of students with varying levels of creativity, academic ability, and motivation. The school was characterized by small classes, close monitoring, and personalized attention given to each individual.

Two Schools 
In the mid 1980s, the North Bay Marin School split into two schools (North Bay Marin School  and North Bay Orinda School (now known as Orinda Academy)), but remained a single corporation with a single Board of Directors. In 1995, the former Head resigned, and the Board of Directors asked Barbara Schakel (a part-time English teacher hired in 1989) to assume the responsibilities of Head of School. In 1998, the North Bay Marin School legally separated from the North Bay Orinda School, established a separate non-profit corporation, and created a new board of directors.

Transformation 
The Marin School, formerly classified as an alternative school, transformed into a college-preparatory school. The school's unique schedule of alternating tradition classroom education and a discussion workshop remained a key feature of the educational program. Barbara J. Brown, EdD, appointed at the beginning of the school year 2011–2012, is now Head of School.

Curriculum
In recent years, The Marin School has expanded its curricular offerings and now has a strong focus in technology and the arts. The school continues to offer small classes, individualized attention, experiential opportunities and an online tracking system that includes daily assignments, biweekly grade updates and daily progress statistics. The “Outside the Walls” program, a series of curriculum-related field trips, is designed to give students a real-world application of their classroom.

Enrollment
The school continues to enroll students with varied interests, learning styles and abilities from different socio-economic backgrounds.  The school also supports 18% of its student body with financial assistance. The Marin School offers small classes with an average of eight students, a small student/teacher ratio, an experiential college-preparatory curriculum, and a focus on the individual.

References

External links
 The Marin School website

High schools in Marin County, California
Private high schools in California
Preparatory schools in California